Foreign relations of China may refer to:

Sovereign states 
 Foreign relations of China, People's Republic of
 Foreign relations of Hong Kong
 Foreign relations of Macau
 Foreign relations of China, Republic of (Taiwan)

Historical countries 
 Foreign relations of Imperial China